Nicholas Kazan (born September 15, 1945) is an American screenwriter, film producer and director.

Early life 
Kazan was born in New York, the son of Greek-American director Elia Kazan and his first wife, playwright Molly Kazan (née Mary Day Thacher). Through his mother, Kazan is a descendant of classicist and college administrator Thomas Anthony Thacher, Yale president Jeremiah Day, and founding father Roger Sherman.

Career 
Kazan, a noted playwright, premiered his play Mlle. God (2011) in Los Angeles with the Ensemble Studio Theatre-LA. A dark comedy, it reinvents Frank Wedekind's "Lulu" character. Kazan said he was inspired "most of all by Louise Brooks' luminous cosmic performance" of the character.

Kazan was nominated for the Academy Award for Best Adapted Screenplay and Golden Globe Award for Best Screenplay for his work on Reversal of Fortune.

Personal life 
In 1984, Kazan married screenwriter Robin Swicord. Their daughters are actresses Zoe Kazan and Maya Kazan.

Filmography 
Frances (1982) (with Christopher De Vore and Eric Bergren)
At Close Range (1986) 
Patty Hearst (1988)
Reversal of Fortune (1990)
Mobsters (1991) (with Michael Mahem)
Dream Lover (1993) (also Director)
Matilda (1996) (with Robin Swicord)
Homegrown (1998) (with Stephen Gyllenhaal)
Fallen (1998)
Bicentennial Man (1999)
Enough (2002)
The Whole Truth (2016)

References

External links 
 
 

1945 births
American male screenwriters
American writers of Greek descent
Living people
Writers from New York City
Screenwriters from New York (state)
Kazan family